Rasas (also spelled Rsas) is a village in southern Syria, administratively part of the al-Suwayda Governorate, located south of al-Suwayda. Nearby localities include 'Ira to the southwest, Sahwat Bilata to the east, al-Ruha to the northeast and Umm Walad to the west. According to the Syria Central Bureau of Statistics (CBS), Rasas had a population of 3,332 in the 2004 census.

History
In 1596 Rasas appeared in the Ottoman tax registers under the name of Irsas (diz nazd Kafr), being part of the nahiya of Bani Nasiyya in the Qada of Hauran. It had an entirely  Muslim  population consisting of 20 households and 10 bachelors. They paid a fixed tax-rate of 40% on agricultural products, including  wheat, barley, summer crops,  goats and bee-hives; a total of 3,880 akçe. Part of the income (8 out of 24 parts) went to a  Waqf.

In 1838 Rasas was noted  by Eli Smith.

References

Bibliography

External links
 Map of the town, Google Maps

Populated places in as-Suwayda District
Druze communities in Syria